Babylonia zeylanica is a species of sea snail, a marine gastropod mollusk, in the family Babyloniidae.

References

zeylanica
Gastropods described in 1789